Whisky Fingers is the fourth studio album by German hard rock band Alex Beyrodt's Voodoo Circle. It was released on 27 November 2015 via AFM Records, and it was produced by Alex Beyrodt. It was the last album with lead singer David Readman, then substituted by Herbie Langhans, the first with Italian drummer Francesco Jovino, instead of Tim Husung, and the only with multi-instrumentalist Alessandro Del Vecchio on keyboards and vocals.

The album was preceded by the release of the single, "Trapped in Paradise", on 15 November 2015.

Track listing
All songs written by Alessandro Del Vecchio, Alex Beyrodt, David Readman, Mat Sinner except where noted.

Personnel

Voodoo Circle

David Readman - vocals
Alex Beyrodt - guitars, producing, arrangement
Mat Sinner - bass guitar, co-arrangement
Alessandro Del Vecchio - keyboards, vocals, co-arrangement, recording, mixing, mastering
Francesco "Cesco" Jovino - drums

Additional personnel
Mattia Stancioiu - drums studio assistant 
Alex Kuehr - photography
Hiko - artwork

References

2015 albums
Voodoo Circle albums
AFM Records albums